Capuana is an Italian surname. Notable people with the surname include:

Franco Capuana, Italian conductor
Luigi Capuana, Italian author and journalist 
Maria Capuana, Italian opera singer
Mario Capuana, Italian composer of motets and a requiem

Italian-language surnames